Zhu Jiner (born 16 November 2002), is a Chinese chess player and Woman Grandmaster (2020). As of March 2022 she is the world's highest ranked woman under 20 years.

Biography
In 2016, she won the World Youth Chess Championship in the G14 age category. In 2017, she was third in the Asian Zone 3.5 after Zhai Mo and Ni Shiqun, and qualified for the Women's World Chess Championship 2018. That same year, she was awarded the FIDE Woman International Master (WIM) title. In 2018, Zhu Jiner won the bronze medal at the Women's China Rapid Chess Championship.

References

External links

2002 births
Living people
Chinese female chess players
Chess Woman International Masters